Robert Linssen (11 April 1911 – 15 May 2004) was a Belgian Zen Buddhist and author.  Linssen wrote in French, but many of his texts have been translated into other languages including English.  Like other Western authorities on the subject of Zen Buddhism (such as the author Alan Watts), Linssen's ideas about Buddhism in general and Zen Buddhism in particular have been influential both to practitioners of Zen and to academics.

Works 
Living Zen (Essai sur le bouddhisme en général et sur le zen en particulier.). 1954.
Zen: The wisdom of the East, a new way of life (Le Zen: Sagesse d'Extreme-Orient: Un Nouvel Art De Vivre?). 1969.
Zen: The Art of Life
Spiritualite de la matiere
La Meditation veritable: Etude des pulsions pre-mentales
Amour, Sexe et Spiritualité
Au-delà du mirage de l'égo
Au-delà du hasard et de l'anti-hasard
Science et spiritualité
Krishnamurti psychologue de l'ère nouvelle
La Mutation Spirituelle Du IIIe Millenaire
L'eveil supreme: Bases pratiques du Ch'an, du Zen et de la pensee de Krishnamurti (1974)

References 
Linssen, Robert. 1988. Living Zen. Grove Press. New York, NY.

External links
 More than 2 hundred Free Articles & Books in French

Zen Buddhism writers
Belgian spiritual writers
Belgian male writers
Belgian Zen Buddhists
1911 births
2004 deaths